Ceranthia tristella is a species of tachinid flies in the genus Ceranthia of the family Tachinidae.

Distribution
United Kingdom, Austria, Hungary, Switzerland.

References

Diptera of Europe
Tachininae
Insects described in 1966